Ortrud is a feminine given name, with variant forms Ortraud and Ortrude.

Ortrud may refer to:

 Ortrud, a character in Richard Wagner's opera Lohengrin
  (1938–1999), German film actress
 Ortrud Mavrin, a character in Anthony Powell's second novel Venusberg (1932)
 Ortrud Oellermann (active from 1981), South African mathematician
 551 Ortrud, a main-belt asteroid

See also
 

German feminine given names